The Ak-Sar-Ben Zephyr was a streamlined passenger train operated by the Chicago, Burlington and Quincy Railroad (CB&Q) between Lincoln, Nebraska and Chicago, Illinois, United States. The first version operated from 1940 to 1947; a revived service operated from 1953 to 1970. The "Ak-Sar-Ben" portion of name was created by spelling Nebraska (Neb-ras-ka) backwards and taken from a fraternal organization of the same name. "Zephyr" was a name applied by the CB&Q to many of its trains, beginning with the Pioneer Zephyr in 1934. The name derived from "Zephyrus", the Greek god of the west wind.

History 
The first Ak-Sar-Ben Zephyr was an eastbound-only daylight service between Lincoln, Nebraska and Chicago. The  journey took nine hours. The train's consist included new lightweight equipment and traditional heavyweight cars. The "Ak-Sar-Ben" portion of name was created by spelling Nebraska (Neb-ras-ka) backwards; a fraternal organization (the Knights of Ak-Sar-Ben) and an arena and horse racing facility in Omaha have also used the name. The Advance Flyer provided westward service. The new service began on December 11, 1940. The CB&Q ended this service in 1947; replacing it with the new Nebraska Zephyr.

The second Ak-Sar-Ben Zephyr was an overnight service between Chicago and Lincoln which used a mixture of 1940s equipment and new cars which it pooled with the California Zephyr, including a "Vista-Dome" dome car. Although gradually downgraded during the 1960s the train survived into the Burlington Northern era before being discontinued in August 1970.

Route
The westbound, as of April 26, 1964, was:

Chicago, Illinois – departed at 10:00 p.m.
La Grange, Illinois
Aurora, Illinois
Mendota, Illinois
Kewanee, Illinois
Galesburg, Illinois
Monmouth, Illinois (Flag Stop)
Burlington, Iowa
Mount Pleasant, Iowa
Fairfield, Iowa
Ottumwa, Iowa
Albia, Iowa
Chariton, Iowa
Osceola, Iowa
Creston, Iowa
Corning, Iowa (Flag Stop)
Villisca, Iowa (Flag Stop)
Red Oak, Iowa
Council Bluffs, Iowa
Omaha, Nebraska
Lincoln, Nebraska – arrived at 9:15 a.m.

The eastbound train departed Lincoln at 9:00 p.m., arriving at Chicago Union Station the following morning at 7:50 a.m.

Equipment
In 1938–1940 the Budd Company constructed a fleet of lightweight cars for the CB&Q for use on various routes. This fleet included baggage cars, dining cars (48 seats), dining-parlor-observation cars, and coaches. Each of these carried a name starting with "Silver", as had become the custom with the CB&Q's Zephyrs. The lightweight equipment for the 1940 Ak-Sar-Ben Zephyr came from this pool.

The 1953 Ak-Sar-Ben Zephyr used both pre-World War II coaches and new equipment manufactured in 1952 for the California Zephyr. The coaches were part of the pool used for the 1940 iteration, among other trains. The westbound Ak-Sar-Ben would use the following cars off the arriving eastbound California Zephyr:
 48-seat dining car
 10-roomette 6-double bedroom sleeping car
 10-roomette 6-double bedroom sleeping car
 16-section sleeping car
 1-drawing room 3-double bedroom Vista-Dome dome-buffet-lounge-observation car
The cars off the eastbound Ak-Sar-Ben Zephyr would in turn be used by that day's westbound California Zephyr.

References

Passenger trains of the Chicago, Burlington and Quincy Railroad
Named passenger trains of the United States
Night trains of the United States
Railway services introduced in 1940
Railway services introduced in 1953
Railway services discontinued in 1947
Railway services discontinued in 1970